Sutton Park Shopping Center is a Shopping Center located in Streamwood, IL. Uncommon among many power shopping areas, Sutton Park is not located near any major malls. Still, the center has attracted many prominent retailers and restaurants.

Current retailers and restaurants include, but are not limited to:

Super Target
Marshall's
Yankee Candle
Pier 1 Imports
Famous Footwear
Justice (CLOSED)
Chili's
Panera Bread

Power centers (retail) in the United States
Streamwood, Illinois
Shopping malls in Cook County, Illinois
Shopping malls established in 1975
1975 establishments in Illinois